The 1951 AAA Championship Car season consisted of 15 races, beginning in Speedway, Indiana on May 30 and concluding in San Mateo, California on November 11.  There was also one non-championship event in Mechanicsburg, Pennsylvania.  The AAA National Champion was Tony Bettenhausen, and the Indianapolis 500 winner was Lee Wallard.

Schedule and results

  Indianapolis 500 was AAA-sanctioned and counted towards the 1951 FIA World Championship of Drivers title.
  Race stopped after 101 laps due to rain.
  No pole is awarded for the Pikes Peak Hill Climb, in this schedule on the pole is the driver who started first. No lap led was awarded for the Pikes Peak Hill Climb, however, a lap was awarded to the drivers that completed the climb.
  Race stopped after 67 laps due to wreck.

Final points standings

Note1: The points became the car, when not only one driver led the car, the relieved driver became small part of the points. Points for driver method: (the points for the finish place) / (number the lap when completed the car) * (number the lap when completed the driver) 
Note2: There were scoring omissions in the AAA records regarding laps completed for eight drivers in the Darlington and Milwaukee races in 1951. The statistics shown include the most accurate representation of those races that is available.

References
 
 
 
 http://media.indycar.com/pdf/2011/IICS_2011_Historical_Record_Book_INT6.pdf  (p. 299-302)

See also
 1951 Indianapolis 500

AAA Championship Car season
AAA Championship Car
1951 in American motorsport
1951 in sports in California